Andrés María Rubio García (June 1, 1924 – 19 April 2006) was an Uruguayan Catholic bishop.

Life

Andrés María Rubio García received on 11 September 1949 the ordination of Salesians of Don Bosco.

He was from 18 May 1968 Auxiliary Bishop of the Roman Catholic Archdiocese of Montevideo and Bishop of Forum Traiani (Titular See). García on 22 May 1975 was appointed Bishop of the Roman Catholic Diocese of Mercedes. This position he held until his resignation on 14 February 1995.

External links
http://www.catholic-hierarchy.org/bishop/bruga.html

1924 births
2006 deaths
Bishops appointed by Pope Paul VI
20th-century Roman Catholic bishops in Uruguay
21st-century Roman Catholic bishops in Uruguay
Salesians of Don Bosco
Uruguayan Roman Catholic bishops
Roman Catholic bishops of Montevideo
Roman Catholic bishops of Mercedes